The AN/TPY-2 Surveillance Transportable Radar, also called the Forward Based X-Band Transportable (FBX-T) is a long-range, very high-altitude active digital antenna array X band surveillance radar designed to add a tier to existing missile and air defence systems. Made by Raytheon, it is the primary radar for the Terminal High Altitude Area Defense (THAAD) missile system, but also cues the AN/MPQ-53 radar of the MIM-104 Patriot system. Patriot PAC-3 is a lower-altitude missile and air defense system than THAAD.

The AN/TPY-2 is a missile-defense radar that can detect, classify, track and intercept ballistic missiles. It has two operating modes – one to detect ballistic missiles as they rise, and another that can guide interceptors toward a descending warhead. Once it detects the missile, it acquires it, tracks it, and uses its powerful radar and complex computer algorithms to discriminate between the warhead and non-threats such as countermeasures in order to destroy the missile with a hit to kill kinetic warhead.

The AN/TPY-2 is a digital antenna array radar, which operates in the 8.55–10 GHz X band. Raytheon builds it as part of an X-band family, along with the National Missile Defense (NMD) X-Band Radar (XBR) and AN/FPS-129 HAVE STARE. The use of X band provides better target resolution than lower frequency bands, for example the L band , though lower frequency bands generally have better performance in detecting low RCS targets. The X band frequency and narrow beam width improve differentiation, or “range resolution,” between smaller objects, such as between warheads, clutter, and decoys. Once the information about the threat of missile is received, determining information such as its speed and trajectory, this data is immediately passed along to (BMDS) tracking, discrimination, and fire control radars downstream. This approach provides extending sensor coverage, the possibility to extend the BMDS battlespace, and the ability to complicate missiles ability to penetrate the defense system. 

The U.S. Missile Defense Agency (MDA) and Raytheon plan to improve detection range and sensitivity of the X-band TPY-2 missile defense radar through the introduction of gallium nitride semiconductor components.

Deployment 

The U.S. Army developed the system and remains responsible for its use by air defense artillery in theater and tactical applications. As a component of national ballistic missile defense, the U.S. Missile Defense Agency is responsible for AN/TPY-2 applications.

It has been deployed in Japan to collect strategic-level information on North Korean missile developments, as well as warning Japan of incoming warheads. Also, AN/TPY-2 radar in Shariki region is able to scan Russian territory near Japan. Japan has bought both PAC-3 for point defense, and is upgrading the AEGIS systems on its Kongo-class destroyers so they can use the longer-range RIM-161 Standard Missile 3 theater ballistic missile defence.

An AN/TPY-2 is based in Alaska as part of United States national missile defense development. The U.S. has agreed to provide it to Israel, to complement their two-tier Arrow 2 missile and Patriot PAC-3 missile defense. 
It complements the fixed AN/FPS-129 HAVE STARE X-Band "large dish" radar, located at Vandenberg Air Force Base. Smaller mobile X-band dishes, not yet designated, may also be paired with the AN/TPY-2.

References

Anti-aircraft warfare
Radar units of the United States Air Force